Breezand is a village in the Dutch province of North Holland. It is a part of the municipality of Hollands Kroon, which is known for its flower bulbs, and lies about 7 km southeast of Den Helder.

Overview
The village was first mentioned in 1665 as Breesant, and means "wide sand" which refers to a former shoal to the north-east of Wieringen. The polder in which Breezand was built, was created in 1847. In 1931, the Catholic St John Evangelist Church was inaugurated. In 1914, a railway station opened on the Amsterdam to Den Helder railway line. It closed in 1938.

Gallery

References

Populated places in North Holland
Hollands Kroon